was a daimyō during mid-Edo period Japan and fifth hereditary chieftain of the Kakegawa-Ōta clan. His courtesy title was Settsu-no-kami.

Biography
Ōta Suketoshi was the son of Ōta Sukeharu, the daimyō of Tatebayashi Domain in Kōzuke Province.  He inherited the leadership of the Ōta clan on his father's death in 1734, but was not confirmed in the position of daimyō of Tatebayashi Domain until 1740. He entered into the administration of the Tokugawa shogunate by serving as sōshaban at Edo Castle. On September 25, 1746 was reassigned from Tatebayashi to Kakegawa Domain in Tōtōmi Province, (modern-day Shizuoka Prefecture) replacing Ogasawara Nagayuki. He subsequently was appointed to the position of Jisha-bugyō. He died at Kakegawa on January 12, 1716, leaving the domain to his son, Ōta Sukeyoshi. His grave is at the Ōta clan bodaiji of Myōhokke-ji in Mishima, Shizuoka.

Ōta Suketoshi was married to an adopted daughter of Itakura Shigeharu, daimyō of Ise-Kameyama Domain.

References 
 Papinot, Edmond. (1906) Dictionnaire d'histoire et de géographie du japon. Tokyo: Librarie Sansaisha...Click link for digitized 1906 Nobiliaire du japon (2003)
 The content of much of this article was derived from that of the corresponding article on Japanese Wikipedia.

|-

Fudai daimyo
Suketoshi
1720 births
1764 deaths